Albert Sercu (26 January 1918, Bornem – 24 August 1978, Roeselare) was a Belgian professional road bicycle racer. He is most known for his silver medal in the Elite race of the 1947 UCI Road World Championships. He rode in the 1947 Tour de France. He is the father of Patrick Sercu.

Major results

1939
 1st, Tour of Flanders (amateur version)
1942
 2nd, National Road Race Championship
1943 - Dilecta
 2nd, Tour of Flanders
 5th, Paris–Roubaix
1944 - Dilecta
1945 - Dilecta
 1st, Bruges-Ghent-Bruges
 1st, Brussels-Everbeek
 1st, Omloop der Vlaamse Bergen
 2nd, Tour of Flanders
 7th, Flèche Wallonne
 9th, Paris–Tours
1946 - Dilecta, JB Louvet, Dossche Cycles
 1st, Brussels-Izegem
 4th, Tour of Belgium
 Winner Stages 4 & 6
 4th, Tour of Flanders
1947 - Bertin, Arbos-Talbot
 1st, Omloop "Het Volk"
 1st, Brussels-Izegem
 1st, Dwars door Vlaanderen
 1st, Nokere Koerse
  World Road Race Championship
 2nd, Scheldeprijs
 3rd, Paris–Tours
 4th, Tour of Belgium
 Winner Stages 1 & 3
 9th, Milan–San Remo
1948 - Bertin-Wolber
 1st, Omloop der Vlaamse Gewesten
 2nd, Paris–Brussels
1949 - Bertin
1950 - Bertin
 1st, Stages 3 & 10, Tour du Maroc
1951 - Bertin

References

1918 births
1978 deaths
Belgian male cyclists
People from Bornem
Cyclists from Antwerp Province